Xifeng may refer to:

Xifeng County, Guizhou
Xifeng County, Liaoning
Xifeng District, Qingyang, Gansu
Xifeng jiu, Chinese alcoholic beverage
Xifeng, Liaoning, town in and seat of Xifeng County
Xifeng, Heilongjiang, in Raohe County

See also
Xie Feng (disambiguation)